Dongducheon Rock Festival is an annual rock festival, which has been held in late summer since 1999 in Dongducheon, South Korea. The motto of the festival includes hopes and wishes for peaceful reunion of South and North Korea. It is considered one of major music festivals in South Korea.

Line-ups
1999
The line-up included Cul-de-sac, Dr.Core 911, Rust Eye, Black Syndrome, Harlequin, Blackhole, Do Won Kyoung, Sinchon Blues, Love And Peace, Boohwal, Sinawe and Yoon Do Hyun

2000
The festival was not held

2001
The line-up included Megadeth, BUCK-TICK, Cul-de-sac, Shin Joong Hyun, Yoon Do Hyun, Do Won Kyoung, Kim Kyung Ho, Lee Eun Mi, Crash, Crying Nut, Sinawe, Blackhole, Gigs, Black Syndrome, 3rd Line Butterfly, Rainysun, Bulldog Mansion, Diablo, No Brain, Pia, Jeremy, Frida Kahlo and Lazybone

2002
The line-up included Peterpan Complex, Siberian Husky, Naked, Samcheong, Jihad, Johnny Royal, Sister's Barbershop, Vassline, Blackhole, No Brain, Grand Slam, Lazybone, Gaia, Lorelei, Jeremy, Black Syndrome, Do Won Kyoung, Crying Nut and Jun In Kwon

2003
The line-up included DOA, Black Hole, Do Won Kyoung, Cinnamon, Crash, Jeremy, Black Syndrome, Lolita No.18, Sister's Barbershop, No Brain, Transfixion, Sinawe, Schizo, Gaia, Hammer and Niflheim

2004
The line-up included Oh! Brothers, The Metal Asia, Jeremy, Black Hole, Oathean, Wiretrap In My Ear, No Brain, Black Syndrome, Do Won Kyoung and N.EX.T.

2005
The line-up included Vanila Unity, Crow, Sangsang Band, Candy Man, Do Won Kyoung, Boohwal and Kim Jong Seo

2006
The line-up included Emoticon, Super Kidd, Island City, Oh! Brothers, Vanila Unity, Vassline, Schizo, Transfixion, Do Won Kyoung, No Brain and YB

2007
The line-up included Wiretrap In My Ear, Pia, Kim Kyung Ho, N.EX.T, Love And Peace, Mir, Dr. Core 911, Oathen, Crow, Diablo, Schizo, Bloody Cookie, Do Won Kyoung, Emoticon, Mad Fret, No.1 Korean and Peterpan Complex, Eve, Vassline, Transfixion

2008
The line-up included Anthrax (American band), Baekdusan, Crash, Moon Hee Jun, Wiretrap In My Ear, Kim Jong Seo, In Sooni, N.EX.T, Survive, Diablo, Crow, Vassline, Oathean, Galaxy Express, Mad Fret, Kim Jong Seo, Cherry Filter, Schizo, Transfixion, Dr. Core 911, Crying Nut, 404 Not Found, Vanila Unity, Boohwal, Do Won Kyoung, Kang San Ae, Maya, No.1 Korea and Super Kidd

2010
The 12th edition of the festival was held at the Soyosan Tourist Resort in Donducheon from August 14-15, 2010. The line-up included Killer Cuts, Morning of July, Geonadeul Locust, Yi Chihyeon and Friends, Yi Hyeonseok Band, Kim Mokkyung Band, Baekdusan Band, Love and Peace, Jongseo Kim and Spring Summer Autumn and Winter (SSAW) for the first day, and Vanilla City, Crow, Crying Nut, Transfiction, Diablo, Kim Soochul Bank, Balckhole, Pia, NEXT and YB for the second day.

See also

List of music festivals in South Korea

References

External links
Official web site

Music festivals established in 1999
Music festivals in South Korea
K-pop festivals
Electronic music festivals in South Korea
Rock festivals in South Korea
Dongducheon
Annual events in South Korea
Summer events in South Korea